Jussiê Ferreira Vieira (born 19 September 1983), commonly known as Jussiê, is a Brazilian former professional footballer who played as a second striker.

Career

Early career
Born in Nova Venécia, Espírito Santo, Jussiê began his career at Cruzeiro in 2001. In mid-2003, he was loaned to J1 League side Kashiwa Reysol, where he scored a total of 5 goals in 17 matches in the league.

Lens
On 30 January 2005, Jussiê joined Lens from Cruzeiro for a reported fee of €3.5 million, on a five-year contract.

Bordeaux
In January 2007, Jussiê joined Bordeaux on loan. On 3 February 2007, he played his first Ligue 1 match for Bordeaux against Nice. He went on to make 16 appearances in the league scoring 2 goals as Bordeaux finished in sixth place. In his club's Coupe de la Ligue final against Lyon he came on as a substitute contributing to a 1–0 win which not only earned Bordeaux the cup but also UEFA Cup qualification.

On 4 June 2007, Jussiê joined Bordeaux permanently on a four-year contract, for an undisclosed fee.

He received French nationality in January 2011.

Jussiê left Bordeaux in summer 2016 after eight years with the club as his contract was not renewed. He expressed disappointment about finding out about his departure via the club website, stating "Given the way I go, inevitably, there is bitterness. I did not understand. I have not had a single call from the president nor anyone. I know that economically, it is a bit complicated for the club. But my story with the Girondins is not a money story".

In February 2017, he announced his retirement from professional football. It had been reported he would play for French amateur club Stade Bordelais but he was denied a playing license by the French Football Federation.

Career statistics

Honours
Cruzeiro
Campeonato Mineiro: 2003, 2004

Lens
UEFA Intertoto Cup: 2005

Bordeaux
Ligue 1: 2009
Coupe de la Ligue: 2007, 2009
Trophée des Champions: 2009

References

External links 

 
 
  
  

1983 births
Living people
People from Nova Venécia
Sportspeople from Espírito Santo
Association football midfielders
Brazilian footballers
Cruzeiro Esporte Clube players
Campeonato Brasileiro Série A players
J1 League players
Ligue 1 players
UAE Pro League players
Kashiwa Reysol players
RC Lens players
FC Girondins de Bordeaux players
Al-Wasl F.C. players
Brazilian expatriate footballers
Brazilian expatriate sportspeople in Japan
Expatriate footballers in Japan
Brazilian expatriate sportspeople in France
Expatriate footballers in France
Brazilian expatriate sportspeople in the United Arab Emirates
Expatriate footballers in the United Arab Emirates